Digimind is a global social media monitoring and competitive intelligence company that provides information on businesses' competitive standing in the market. Digimind was founded in 1998 and has been profitable ever since. As of 2019, the company has more than 200 employees across offices in North America, Europe, Asia and Africa.

History

Digimind was founded in 1998 by Paul Vivant, Patrice François, Gerald Navarette and Romain Laboisse in Grenoble, France. Within a year, they launched vStrat, a collaborative market intelligence software tool for Lotus Notes (now IBM Notes). This was followed by the release of Strategic Finder, a meta search engine, in 1999. By the end of 1999, the software had reached over 60,000 users.

In 2003 the company launched Digimind Evolution, a competitive intelligence software application. The company's subsequent success and expansion in both French- and English-speaking markets facilitated the opening of a Research & Development centre in Rabat, Morocco in 2006, and an office in Cambridge, MA in 2008. In 2007, Digimind launched Digimind 7, an application providing real-time visual analysis of news stories.

In 2019 Digimind was named a leader in Market and Competitive Intelligence Platforms by Forrester Research.

References

Software companies of France
Companies established in 1998
1998 establishments in France
Organizations based in Grenoble